Iqaluit East was a territorial electoral district (riding) for the Legislative Assembly of Nunavut, Canada.

The riding consisted of the easterly portions of Iqaluit and the community of Apex.

Its most recent Member of the Legislative Assembly was Eva Aariak, the former Premier of Nunavut.

Election results

1999 election

2004 election

2008 election

References

External links
Website of the Legislative Assembly of Nunavut

Electoral districts of Qikiqtaaluk Region
1999 establishments in Nunavut
2013 disestablishments in Nunavut